Tarfessock is a hill in the Range of the Awful Hand, a sub-range of the Galloway Hills range, part of the Southern Uplands of Scotland. A craggy hill, it is the lowest Donald in the range, being completely obscured by Kirriereoch Hill when viewed from the Merrick. A nearby south top is dotted with a series of lochans. A farmhouse of the same name is located to the west, which along with the hill was at one time the property of the Marquess of Ailsa.

Subsidiary SMC Summits

References

Mountains and hills of South Ayrshire
Mountains and hills of the Southern Uplands
Donald mountains